The Otto H. Baring House is a house of the Bungalow/American Craftsman style located in Houston, Texas. It was listed on the National Register of Historic Places in 1988.

See also
 National Register of Historic Places listings in Harris County, Texas

References

1921 establishments in Texas
Bungalow architecture in Texas
Houses completed in 1921
Houses in Houston
Houses on the National Register of Historic Places in Texas
National Register of Historic Places in Houston